"Do You Know (What It Takes)" is a song by Swedish singer and songwriter Robyn, released as the third single from her debut studio album, Robyn Is Here (1996). In the United Kingdom, it was issued as Robyn's second single in November 1996, while in the United States, it was released as her debut single the following year. The song was written by Robyn, Herbie Crichlow, Denniz Pop, and Max Martin, and it was produced by Pop and Martin.

In Robyn's native Sweden, "Do You Know (What It Takes)" was her second top-10 hit, peaking at number 10. It was her first top-10 single in the United States, reaching number seven on the Billboard Hot 100. In August 1998, the single was certified Gold in the US by the Recording Industry Association of America (RIAA) for sales of 500,000 copies. The single was slightly less successful in the United Kingdom, peaking at number 26 after a re-release in August 1997.

Critical reception
AllMusic editor Stephen Thomas Erlewine described the song as "dynamite" in his review of Robyn Is Here. Larry Flick from Billboard declared it as a "bright'n'bouncy ditty" and a "youth-driven smash". He complimented the singer's "oh-so-charming presence, which is sorta a hybrid of Brandy and Monica with a pinch of Mariah Carey", adding that Robyn "makes the most of the song's irresistibly sweet chorus and finger-poppin' funky backbeat." Dave Sholin from the Gavin Report noted that "rarely does word about a record spread as quickly as it has for this Swedish production." Pan-European magazine Music & Media stated that the 16-year old Robyn "has mastered the R&B genre to a T." They noted that she "supplies the sassy rhymes, while master-producer [Denniz] Pop takes care of the perky beats and poppy arrangements." 

A reviewer from Music Week rated it four out of five, adding that the singer "delivers a slick uptempo number which could see her make the Top 40". It was also described as "irresistible". Kirstin Watson from Smash Hits viewed it as a "happy ditty" and a "right catchy little number". Ian Hyland from Sunday Mirror gave it nine out of ten, commenting, "Exploding the myth that Swedish popsters are all Paul Calf haircuts and Magnum moustaches, the girl Robyn shows she sure can funk. Large summer chorus in the house." David Sinclair from The Times called it a "pouting, pop-soul confection".

Music video

There were made two different versions of the music video for "Do You Know (What It Takes)"; a European version and a US version. The latter was directed by American director Kevin Bray. The European version was later published on Robyn's official YouTube channel in October 2009. It has amassed more than 2,1 million views as of September 2021.

Track listings

Sweden
 CD single
 "Do You Know (What It Takes)" (radio edit) – 3:30
 "Do You Know (What It Takes)" (Allstar Short) – 3:58

 CD maxi-single
 "Do You Know (What It Takes)" (radio edit) – 3:30
 "Do You Know (What It Takes)" (Allstar Main & Rap) – 4:59
 "Do You Know (What It Takes)" (Paradise Garage Mix) – 4:59
 "Do You Know (What It Takes)" (E-Smoove Bounce Mix Edit) – 4:05

United Kingdom
 12-inch promo
Side A
 "Do You Know What It Takes" (125th Street Mix) – 4:07
 "Do You Know What It Takes" (Paradise Garage Mix) – 4:59
 "Do You Know What It Takes" (a cappella) – 2:00
Side B
 "Do You Know What It Takes" (Kojo's Street Mix) – 5:16
 "Do You Know What It Takes" (radio edit) – 3:42

 CD single
 "Do You Know (What It Takes)" (radio edit) - 3:30
 "Do You Know (What It Takes)" (Allstar mix – main and rap) - 4:59
 "Do You Know (What It Takes)" (E-Smoove Bounce mix) - 4:05
 "Do You Know (What It Takes)" (Paradise Garage mix) - 4:59
 "Do You Know (What It Takes)" (125th Street mix) - 4:07

United States
 12-inch promo
Side A
 "Do You Know (What It Takes)" (E-Smoove Bounce Mix) – 5:29
 "Do You Know (What It Takes)" (LP version) – 3:42
Side B
 "Do You Know (What It Takes)" (Dee's Full Mix) – 5:42
 "Do You Know (What It Takes)" (Dee's Club Mix) – 5:41

 CD single
 "Do You Know (What It Takes)" (LP version) – 3:43
 "Do You Know (What It Takes)" (E-Smoove Bounce Mix Edit) – 4:06
 "Do You Know (What It Takes)" (Dee's Full Mix Edit) – 4:02

Personnel
 Lyrics – Robyn, Herbie Crichlow
 Music – Robyn, Denniz Pop, Max Martin, Herbie Crichlow
 Arrangement, production, recording and mixing – Denniz Pop, Max Martin

Source:

Charts

Weekly charts

Year-end charts

Certifications

|}

Release history

References

1996 singles
1997 singles
Ariola Records singles
Bertelsmann Music Group singles
Music videos directed by Kevin Bray (director)
RCA Records singles
Robyn songs
Song recordings produced by Denniz Pop
Song recordings produced by Max Martin
Songs written by Denniz Pop
Songs written by Herbie Crichlow
Songs written by Max Martin
Songs written by Robyn